Josef Walter (1 December 1901 – July 1973) was a Swiss gymnast and Olympic medalist. He competed at the 1936 Summer Olympics in Berlin where he received a silver medal in  floor exercise. He was among the non-scoring members of the Swiss team that won silver medals in the team all-around event at the 1936 Olympics. (Teams had eight members, and the six best scores counted in the team competition).

References

1901 births
1973 deaths
Swiss male artistic gymnasts
Gymnasts at the 1936 Summer Olympics
Olympic gymnasts of Switzerland
Olympic silver medalists for Switzerland
Olympic medalists in gymnastics
Medalists at the 1936 Summer Olympics
20th-century Swiss people